Melissa & Joey is an American television sitcom starring Melissa Joan Hart and Joey Lawrence. The series revolves around Melanie "Mel" Burke (Hart), an up-and-coming local politician who hires Joseph  "Joe" Longo (Lawrence), a recently divorced commodities broker, as the nanny for her niece and nephew. The series premiered on August 17, 2010, on ABC Family.

Melissa & Joey stood as Wednesday's No.1 cable TV telecast at 8 o'clock in Adults 18–34, Women 18–34, Women 18–49  and Females 12–34 Demographics. Season 2 also dominated its cable time period, ranking No.1 across key measures Adults 18–34, Women 18–34, Adults 18–49, Women 18–49, Viewers 12–34 and Females 12–34.

On February 9, 2015, ABC Family decided to end the show after four seasons and a total of 104 episodes for the series. The series finale aired on August 5, 2015.

Series overview

Episodes

Season 1 (2010–11)

Season 2 (2012)

Season 3 (2013–14)

Season 4 (2014–15)

Ratings

Season 1

Season 2

Season 3

Season 4

References

General references

External links
 
 

Lists of American romance television series episodes
Lists of American sitcom episodes
Split television seasons